World Series of Fighting Global Championship 1: China was a mixed martial arts event held  in Haikou, China.

Background
This was the first World Series of Fighting Global Championship event, the main event was a fight between Jeremy May and Evgeny Erokhin for the inaugural WSOF GC Heavyweight Championship.

Results

See also 
 List of WSOF champions
 List of WSOF events

References

World Series of Fighting events
2015 in mixed martial arts
2015 in Chinese sport
Haikou
Sport in Hainan
Mixed martial arts in China